Kirsten Johanne Holst Høybye (March 18, 1936, in Lemvig – September 22, 2008, in Vejle) was a Danish author, best remembered for her book Min ven Thomas (1987).

References 

1936 births
2008 deaths
Danish writers
Danish women writers
Women writers of young adult literature